WGTJ is an AM Christian radio station broadcasting a Christian radio format on 1330 kHz with 1000 watts during daytime hours. WGTJ is simulcast on an FM translator W248DL at 97.5 MHz. The broadcast facility is licensed to Murrayville, Georgia, USA. The station is owned by Vision Communications, Inc.

History
The station went on the air as WKZD on July 1, 1986. On July 30, 1999, the station changed its call sign to WGTJ.

References

External links

GTJ
Southern Gospel radio stations in the United States
GTJ